Ochotrichobolus is a genus of fungi in the Thelebolaceae family. This is a monotypic genus, containing the single species Ochotrichobolus polysporus.

References

External links
Index Fungorum

Leotiomycetes
Monotypic Leotiomycetes genera